The 1780s (pronounced "seventeen-eighties") was a decade of the Gregorian calendar that began on January 1, 1780, and ended on December 31, 1789. A period widely considered as transitional between the Age of Enlightenment and the Industrial Revolution, the 1780s saw the inception of modern philosophy. With the rise on astronomical, technological, and political discoveries and innovations such as Uranus, cast iron on structures, republicanism and hot-air balloons, the 1780s kick-started a rapid global industrialization movement, leaving behind the world's predominantly agrarian customs in the past.

References